Stephen John Waine (born May 1959) is an Anglican priest. Since February 2015, he has been the Dean of Chichester. He had been the Archdeacon of Dorset from 2010 to 2015.

Early life
Waine was born in 1959, son of John Waine, later Bishop of Stafford, of St Edmundsbury and Ipswich and of Chelmsford. He studied Economic and Social Studies at the University of East Anglia and graduated Bachelor of Arts (BA) in 1980. He then trained for the priesthood at Westcott House, Cambridge.

Ordained ministry
Waine was made a deacon at Petertide 1984 (1 July) by his father, the Bishop of St Edmundsbury and Ipswich, at St Edmundsbury Cathedral (by letters dimissory from the vacant See of Lichfield). He was ordained a Church of England priest the next year, 1985. He then served his curacy at St Peter's Church, Wolverhampton. He was Succentor at St Paul's Cathedral from 1988 to 1993. After this, he was Vicar of St Edward the Confessor Church, Romford. In 2010, he was appointed Archdeacon of Dorset.

In November 2014 it was announced that he would succeed Nicholas Frayling as Dean of Chichester. He took up the post in February 2015: he was instituted on 14 February.

References

1959 births
Living people
Alumni of the University of East Anglia
Archdeacons of Dorset
Deans of Chichester
Alumni of Westcott House, Cambridge